Neil Gordon Grayston (born March 24, 1981) is a Canadian actor.

Biography
He won a 2006 Leo Award (Best Supporting Performance by a Male in a Dramatic Series) for his performance in the Godiva's episode "The Bigger Man". Neil played Douglas Fargo in Eureka, a Syfy network series that began broadcasting in 2006.

Grayston is of Scottish, French, Romanian and Irish descent.

Filmography

Film

Television

Webseries

References

External links 

 

1981 births
Living people
People from New Westminster
Canadian male film actors
Canadian male television actors
Canadian male voice actors
Canadian people of Irish descent
Canadian people of French descent
Canadian people of Romanian descent
Male actors from British Columbia